West Milton is a small village in western Dorset, in South West England, about  northeast of Bridport and  west of Powerstock. The village is on the Mangerton River, a tributary of the River Asker. West Milton is part of Powerstock civil parish.

Toponymy
The name "Milton" is a contraction of "Middleton". The Domesday Book of AD 1086 records it as Mideltone. An entry for 1212 in the Book of Fees records it as Midelton.

It is derived from the Old English middel-tūn. The word tūn originally meant "fence", but came to mean "enclosure" or "homestead". Hence a Middelton was the middle homestead of a group. "West" distinguishes it from Milton Abbas near Blandford Forum.

Chapel and church
West Milton has long been a dependent chapelry of Powerstock. It had a Mediæval chapel of St Mary Magdalene, and in 1869 the architect GR Crickmay of Weymouth designed a new Gothic Revival chapel to replace it. It was a stone building with a spirelet on one side and an apse at one end.

In 1873–76 the body of the Mediæval chapel was dismantled and re-erected in Powerstock as an extension to the parish school. Only the embattled west tower was left in West Milton. This was built about 1500 and is now both a Scheduled Ancient Monument and a Grade II* listed building.

In 1976 the 19th-century church was demolished.

Secular history
The village used to have two pubs: The Leopard (now Leopard Cottage) and The Red Lion (now Red Lion Cottages).
Further, there are records of ale being sold from 'The Ship' inn, however it is not known where this was in the village. 

It was a grist and flax mill, and last worked commercially in 1966. It has since been a tourist attraction and café.

West Milton had its own watermill on the same river. The mill was the home of the writer and broadcaster Kenneth Allsop until his death in 1973. Here he wrote In the Country, a collection of essays mostly about the surrounding Dorset countryside.

References

Bibliography

External links

Powerstock

Villages in Dorset